Storfinnforsen Hydroelectric Power Station is a run-of-the-river hydroelectric power station on the Faxälven, in Västernorrland County, Sweden.

The power plant was operational in 1953 (or 1954). It is owned and operated by E.ON.

Dam
Storfinnforsen Dam consists of a concrete buttress dam (length 800 m) with 100 buttresses and an embankment dam (length 400 m) on the left side. There are cracks in the upstream frontplate as well as in some of the supports.

Power plant 
The power plant contains 3 Francis turbine-generators. The total nameplate capacity is 112 (or 132) MW. Its average annual generation is 536 GWh. The hydraulic head is 49.5 m.

See also

 List of hydroelectric power stations in Sweden

External links

References

Dams in Sweden
Hydroelectric power stations in Sweden
Buttress dams
Embankment dams
Dams completed in 1954
Energy infrastructure completed in 1954
1954 establishments in Sweden